The Ministry of Strategic Industries of Ukraine is a government ministry in Ukraine that was established on 22 July 2020.

Its first minister was Oleh Urusky who was appointed on 16 July 2020 (and who was also appointed Vice Prime Minister in the Shmyhal Government simultaneously). 

Prime minister Denys Shmyhal stated (at a government meeting on 22 July 2020) that the a new ministry that will focus primarily on industrial development, as well as on defense and high-tech industries. According  to minister Urusky (also stated on 22 July 2020) the ministry's goal is "sustainable development of strategic industries, job creation, increase budget revenues, regional development, will have a positive impact on the market environment."

The ministry looks to reform the State Defense Holding Ukroboronprom and split it into two "Defense Systems of Ukraine" and "Avia-space Systems of Ukraine". It is expected that companies of the State Space Agency of Ukraine will join the organization as well.

List of ministers

See also
 Ministry of Industrial Policy (Ukraine)
 Industry in Ukraine
 Shmyhal Government

Notes

References

External links
 [ Official website] 

Strategic Industries
Strategic Industries
Ukraine, Strategic Industries
2020 establishments in Ukraine
Ukraine, Strategic Industries